Ilam  is a suburb of Christchurch, New Zealand about five kilometres west of the city centre. It is the location of the University of Canterbury.

Located adjacent to State Highway 1 and the Christchurch International Airport, it is handily placed for transportation. It is also located close to the major retail area of Riccarton.

The suburb was named after the ancestral home of the Hon. John Watts-Russell (1825–75), who hailed from Ilam Hall in Staffordshire, England. The Ilam homestead was in the 1950s inhabited by the rector of Canterbury College, Henry Rainsford Hulme. In 1954 the homestead gained notoriety as Hulme's 16-year-old daughter Juliet was involved in the Parker–Hulme murder case. The homestead was used as a major location for Peter Jackson's film about the murders, Heavenly Creatures. The homestead has been the University of Canterbury Staff Club since 1971.

Demographics

Ilam had a population of 9,357 at the 2018 New Zealand census, an increase of 357 people (4.0%) since the 2013 census, and an increase of 825 people (9.7%) since the 2006 census. There were 2,628 households. There were 4,881 males and 4,473 females, giving a sex ratio of 1.09 males per female, with 1,083 people (11.6%) aged under 15 years, 4,293 (45.9%) aged 15 to 29, 2,931 (31.3%) aged 30 to 64, and 1,053 (11.3%) aged 65 or older.

Ethnicities were 67.8% European/Pākehā, 5.9% Māori, 2.3% Pacific peoples, 28.5% Asian, and 3.2% other ethnicities (totals add to more than 100% since people could identify with multiple ethnicities).

The proportion of people born overseas was 37.8%, compared with 27.1% nationally.

Although some people objected to giving their religion, 51.2% had no religion, 35.3% were Christian, 1.9% were Hindu, 2.2% were Muslim, 1.8% were Buddhist and 2.7% had other religions.

Of those at least 15 years old, 2,352 (28.4%) people had a bachelor or higher degree, and 507 (6.1%) people had no formal qualifications. The employment status of those at least 15 was that 2,790 (33.7%) people were employed full-time, 1,599 (19.3%) were part-time, and 468 (5.7%) were unemployed.

Education
Ilam Primary School, also located on Ilam Road, is a primary school situated next to the Canterbury University whose facilities the school uses. The school educates many children from overseas.

The school was founded in 1961.

It was established in 1923.

Rolls are as of 

The Canterbury Japanese Supplementary School (カンタベリー日本語補習校 Kantaberī Nihongo Hoshūkō), a weekend Japanese school, holds its classes at the Ilam School in Ilam.

References

Suburbs of Christchurch